"Bustin' Loose (Part 1)" is a hit song for Chuck Brown & the Soul Searchers. Released from the album of the same name, it spent four weeks at the top of the R&B singles chart in early 1979 and peaked at number 34 on the Billboard Hot 100 singles chart.

Popular culture
"Bustin' Loose" has been played after every home run the Washington Nationals hit at Nationals Park since that stadium's opening in 2008 until the present, with the exception of the 2015 and 2016 seasons, when the Jessie J song "Bang Bang" was played.
It's been the victory song for the Washington Capitals and the Washington Wizards.
It can be heard on the 27th Treehouse of Horror episode of The Simpsons, during when Homer cannibalizes himself.
The Nelly song "Hot in Herre" contains an interpolation of "Bustin' Loose".
The song is featured in the video game Driver Parallel Lines.
In season 3 episode 1 of "The Deuce", the song can be heard in the final scene.
 It played during the intro of the movie "The Honeymooners", starring Cedric the Entertainer.

References

1979 singles
1979 songs
Chuck Brown songs
Go-go songs